The 1968 Eastern Illinois Panthers football team was an American football team that represented Eastern Illinois University in the Interstate Intercollegiate Athletic Conference (IIAC) during the 1968 NCAA College Division football season. Led by fourth-year head coach Clyde Biggers, the Panthers compiled an overall record of 4–5 with a mark of 1–2 in conference play, tying for third place in the IIAC. The team played its home games at Lincoln Field in Charleston, Illinois. 

Quarterback Joe Davis led the team with 1,363 yards of total offense, an average of 151.4 yards per game. Davis also set an EIU single-season record with 307 yards of total offense.

Fullback Dennis Bundy was the leading rusher with 529 rushing yards and 10 touchdowns on 155 carries. 

Tight end Ed Stephens was the team's leading receiver with 40 catches for 483 yards and three touchdowns. Stephens also set an EIU single-season record with 99 receiving yards against Wayne State. The club also set the school's single-game total offense record with 545 yards against Wayne State.

Schedule

Roster

References 

Eastern Illinois
Eastern Illinois Panthers football seasons
Eastern Illinois Panthers football